An STD is a sexually transmitted disease.

STD may also refer to:

Businesses and organisations
 STD of RSFSR, a Russian actors' trade union
 S.T.D. Motors, an early English car manufacturer

Finance
 São Tomé and Príncipe dobra, a currency (by ISO 4217 code)
 Short term disability, a disability insurance term

Places
 Mayor Buenaventura Vivas Airport, Santo Domingo, Venezuela (by IATA code)
 Strathclyde, former administrative area of Scotland (by genealogical Chapman code)
 Stroud railway station, Gloucestershire, England (by GBR station code)

Technology
 std, the C++ Standard Library namespace
 STD Bus, a computer bus that was used primarily for industrial control systems
 Internet Standards (such as STD 68)
 Subscriber trunk dialling, a long-distance telephone calling feature

Other uses
 Sentinelese language, a hypothesised language of North Sentinel Island, India
 Doctor of Sacred Theology (Sacrae Theologiae Doctor), the Roman Catholic Church's highest academic degree
 Star Trek: Discovery, an American science-fiction television series

See also
 Standard (disambiguation)